Simon Fischer (born June 21, 1988) is an American-born Swiss professional ice hockey player who is currently playing with HC La Chaux-de-Fonds of the Swiss League (SL). He previously played in the National League (NL) for EV Zug, EHC Biel and Lausanne HC.

Fischer made his National League (NL) debut playing with EV Zug during the 2005-06 season.

References

External links

1988 births
Living people
EHC Biel players
EV Zug players
HC Red Ice players
Lausanne HC players
Sportspeople from New Rochelle, New York
Ice hockey players from New York (state)
American men's ice hockey left wingers